Amarchinta is a municipality and Mandal headquarters located in Wanaparthy district in the Telangana state of India. Jurala Project is a dam on the Krishna River situated about 12 km from Amarchinta.

Villages 
The villages in  Amarchinta mandal include:

 Amarchintha
 Mastipur
 Pamireddipalle
 Kankanvanipalle
 Singampeta
 Nandimalla
 Chinthareddipalle
 Mittanandimalla
 Erladinne
 Chandraghad
 Dharmapur
 Nagalkadumur
 Kistampalle

References 

Panchayati raj (India)
Mandals in Wanaparthy district
Census towns in Wanaparthy district
Wanaparthy district